The flea beetle is a small, jumping beetle of the leaf beetle family (Chrysomelidae), that makes up the tribe Alticini which is part of the subfamily Galerucinae. Historically the flea beetles were classified as their own subfamily.

Though most tribes of the Galerucinae are suspect of rampant paraphyly in the present delimitation, the Alticini seem to form a good clade.

Description and ecology
The adults are very small to moderately sized Chrysomelidae (i.e. among beetles in general they are on the smallish side). They are similar to other leaf beetles, but characteristically have the hindleg femora greatly enlarged. These enlarged femora allow for the springing action of these insects when disturbed. Flea beetles can also walk normally and fly.  Many flea beetles are attractively colored; dark, shiny and often metallic colors predominate.

Adult flea beetles feed externally on plants, eating the surface of the leaves, stems and petals. Under heavy feeding the small round holes caused by an individual flea beetle's feeding may coalesce into larger areas of damage. Some flea beetle larvae (e.g. of Phyllotreta species) are root feeders.

In adverse weather conditions (rain, for example) some flea beetles seek shelter in the soil. Some species, such as Phyllotreta cruciferae and P. striolata, prefer to leave their hideouts only during warm and dry weather. The German name Erdflöhe (literally "earth fleas") refers to their jumping ability and this behavior of hiding in the soil.

Relationship with humans
Flea beetles may be beneficial or may be pests, depending on the species.

Pest

Many major agricultural crops are attacked by flea beetles, including various cruciferous plants such as mustard and rapeseed (particularly canola in northwestern North America). Numerous garden plants are also subject to flea beetle feeding, such as flowers of Gardenia and Rothmannia by Altica species.

Flea beetles execute their most severe attacks during dry weather and are most active on sunny days. The larvae are known to chew roots.

Companion plant

Flea beetles can be deterred by a number of different companion plants, that can be grown intercropped in a garden to benefit neighboring plants. For example, thyme, catnip, and other kinds of mint cover up the scent of nearby plants.

Radishes, on the other hand, can be grown as a trap crop, luring the flea beetles away from more important crops. Since the root isn't harmed by the beetles, they remain useful, themselves.

A number of natural predators can be employed to keep flea beetles in check, including two that parasitize it: braconid wasps and tachinid flies. In both cases, the larval stage feeds on the flea beetle, while the adults feed on nectar and pollen; some species are even important pollinators. To encourage braconid wasps and tachinid flies, some types of flowers can be planted between crops: umbels such as caraway, herb fennel, coriander and Ammi majus, and simple open flowers such as California poppies and pot marigolds, as well as yarrows.

Beneficial insect
Other flea beetle species are beneficial, feeding on weeds and similar nuisance plants. A few species have even been introduced to various locations as biological control agents against some weeds. One important example is in the control of leafy spurge (Euphorbia virgata), an invasive weed in the United States. It has a toxic latex and is generally avoided by herbivores. Flea beetles of the genus Aphthona have been successfully introduced to control this plant.

Selected genera
This genus list is not complete. It is also partially from ITIS and might include genera placed elsewhere in other sources.

 Acallepitrix J.Bechyné, 1956 
 Acrocyum Jacoby, 1885
 Afroaltica Biondi & D'Alessandro, 2007
 Agasicles Jacoby, 1904
 Altica Geoffroy, 1762
 Andersonoplatus Linzmeier & Konstantinov, 2018
 Anthobiodes Weise, 1887
 Aphthona Chevrolat in Dejean, 1836
 Aphthonoides Jacoby, 1885
 Apteropeda Chevrolat in Dejean, 1836
 Argopistes Motschulsky, 1860
 Argopus Fischer von Waldheim, 1824
 Arrhenocoela Foudras, 1861
 Asphaera Duponchel & Chevrolat, 1842
 Aulacothorax Boheman, 1858
 Batophila Foudras, 1860
 Blepharida Chevrolat in Dejean, 1836
 Capraita J.Bechyné, 1957 
 Cerataltica Crotch, 1873
 Chaetocnema Stephens, 1831
 Cornulactica Bechyné, 1955
 Crepidodera Chevrolat in Dejean, 1836
 †Crepidocnema Moskeyko et al., 2010
 Derocrepis Weise, 1886
 Dibolia Latreille, 1829
 Disonycha Chevrolat in Dejean, 1836
 Distigmoptera Blake, 1943
 Dysphenges Horn, 1894
 Epitrix Foudras in Mulsant, 1859
 Glenidion H.Clark, 1860 
 Glyptina J.L.LeConte, 1859 
 Hemiglyptus Horn, 1889
 Hemiphrynus Horn, 1889
 Hermaeophaga Foudras, 1860
 Heyrovskya Madar & Madar, 1968
 Hippuriphila Foudras in Mulsant, 1859
 Hornaltica Barber, 1941
 Kashmirobia Konstantinov & Prathapan, 2006
 Kuschelina J.Bechyné, 1951
 Lanka Maulik, 1926
 Longitarsus Berthold, 1827
 Luperaltica Crotch, 1873
 Lupraea Jacoby, 1885
 Lysathia J.Bechyné, 1957 
 Lythraria Bedel, 1897
 Mantura Stephens, 1831
 Margaridisa J.Bechyné, 1958 
 Minota Kutschera, 1859
 Mniophila Stephens, 1831
 Mniophilosoma Wollaston, 1854
 Monomacra Chevrolat in Dejean, 1836
 Neocrepidodera Heikertinger, 1911
 Nesaecrepida Blake, 1964
 Nisotra Baly, 1864
 Ochrosis Foudras, 1861
 Oedionychis Latreille, 1829
 Omophoita Chevrolat in Dejean, 1836
 Orestia Chevrolat in Dejean, 1836
 Pachyonychis H.Clark, 1860 
 Pachyonychus F.E.Melsheimer, 1847 
 Palaeothona Jacoby, 1885
 Parchicola J.Bechyné and B.Springlová de Bechyné, 1975 
 Phydanis Horn, 1889
 Phyllotreta Chevrolat in Dejean, 1836
 Podagrica Chevrolat in Dejean, 1836
 Pseudodibolia Jacoby, 1891
 Pseudolampsis Horn, 1889
 Pseudorthygia Csiki in Heikertinger and Csiki, 1940 
 Psylliodes Berthold, 1827
 Sphaeroderma Stephens, 1831
 Strabala Chevrolat in Dejean, 1836
 Syphrea Baly, 1876
 Systena Chevrolat in Dejean, 1836
 Trichaltica Harold, 1876
 Ugandaltica D'Alessandro & Biondi, 2018

See also
 List of flea beetle genera

References

External links

 Flea beetle description at Kansas State University
 Flea Beetles, Kansas State University, July 2008
 The Handbook of Palearctic Flea Beetles - identification of Palearctic flea beetle genera, along with morphology, host plant information, and literature references
 "Flea Beetles" by W.S. Cranshaw, Colorado State University Extension entomologist and professor

 
Articles containing video clips